Wan dam, (also known as Daunapur Dam) is an earthfill dam on Wan river near Ambejogai, Beed district  in the state of Maharashtra in India.

Specifications

Purpose
Irrigation

See also
 Dams in Maharashtra
 List of reservoirs and dams in India
Wan Hydroelectric Project

References

Dams in Beed district
Dams completed in 1966
Economy of Maharashtra
1966 establishments in Maharashtra